Josip Ivančić (born 29 March 1991) is a Croatian professional footballer who plays as a striker for Thai League 1 club Lampang.

Club career
Ivančić started his football career in his hometown Sesvete, debuting for Croatia Sesvete in the 2010–11 2. HNL season. In July 2011, he moved to Zadar in Croatia's 1. HNL where he played until August 2014 when he was transferred to Rijeka.

In January 2016, Ivančić was transferred to Moldovan Divizia Națională club Sheriff Tiraspol, leaving the club in January of the following year. After Sheriff, he spent his time in Israel playing for Hapoel Ashkelon, Hapoel Haifa and Ashdod. After Israel, Ivančić played for Kazakhstan Premier League club Atyrau and Romanian club Chindia Târgoviște.

On 24 August 2020, he signed a two-year contract with Bosnian Premier League club Zrinjski Mostar. Three days later, on 27 August, Ivančić made his official debut and scored his first goal for Zrinjski in a game against Differdange 03 in the 2020–21 UEFA Europa League first qualifying round. He decided to leave the club in April 2021, near the end of the 2020–21 season.

On 4 January 2022, he signed a two-year contract with V.League 1 club Hanoi.

Honours
Koper
Slovenian Supercup: 2015

Sheriff Tiraspol
Divizia Națională: 2015–16
Moldovan Super Cup: 2016

Hapoel Haifa
Israel State Cup: 2017–18

References

External links

1991 births
Living people
Footballers from Zagreb
Croatian footballers
Association football forwards
NK Croatia Sesvete players
NK Zadar players
HNK Rijeka players
HNK Rijeka II players
FC Koper players
FC Sheriff Tiraspol players
Hapoel Ashkelon F.C. players
Hapoel Haifa F.C. players
F.C. Ashdod players
FC Atyrau players
AFC Chindia Târgoviște players
HŠK Zrinjski Mostar players
Sabah F.C. (Malaysia) players
Hanoi FC players
Croatian Football League players
Slovenian PrvaLiga players
Israeli Premier League players
Moldovan Super Liga players
Kazakhstan Premier League players
Liga I players
Premier League of Bosnia and Herzegovina players
Malaysia Super League players
V.League 1 players
Croatian expatriate footballers
Expatriate footballers in Slovenia
Expatriate footballers in Moldova
Expatriate footballers in Israel
Expatriate footballers in Kazakhstan
Expatriate footballers in Romania
Expatriate footballers in Bosnia and Herzegovina
Expatriate footballers in Malaysia
Expatriate footballers in Vietnam
Croatian expatriate sportspeople in Slovenia
Croatian expatriate sportspeople in Moldova
Croatian expatriate sportspeople in Israel
Croatian expatriate sportspeople in Kazakhstan
Croatian expatriate sportspeople in Romania
Croatian expatriate sportspeople in Bosnia and Herzegovina
Croatian expatriate sportspeople in Malaysia
Croatian expatriate sportspeople in Vietnam